Cahill Gordon & Reindel LLP (founded 1919) is a New York-based international law firm with  offices in New York, Washington, D.C. and London. The firm is prominent in the practice areas of capital markets and banking & finance.

History
Cahill opened its doors at 120 Broadway in 1919 as McAdoo, Cotton & Franklin. In 1921 William G. McAdoo moved away to California, and the firm was renamed Cotton & Franklin.  By the end of the Depression, it expanded to handle bankruptcies, reorganizations, and regulatory matters. During and after the Second World War, under the leadership of John T. Cahill, former United States Attorney for the Southern District of New York, the firm grew dramatically. As Cahill Gordon Reindel & Ohl, it moved to 80 Pine Street, where it remained until 2020, then it moved to 32 Old Slip. Partner John Ohl, a tax specialist, retired in 1976. The firm established its Paris office in 1928, though it closed in 2000 when the firm opened its London office.  Today, Cahill maintains offices in London and Washington D.C, though its largest office by far is in New York City.

Litigation work
On behalf of Cahill, Floyd Abrams successfully defended The New York Times in the landmark New York Times Co. v. United States case.  In that 1971, case the Supreme Court of the United States refused to permit the Nixon Administration to stop the publication of thousands of pages of Vietnam War-related government documents. Thereafter, Abrams and Cahill became prominent defenders of the media and First Amendment rights. On September 9, 2009, Abrams argued before the Supreme Court on behalf of Senator Mitch McConnell in the highly publicized re-argument ordered by the Court on the constitutionality of McCain-Feingold, defending the rights of corporations and unions to donate unlimited amounts of money to political allies in Citizens United v. Federal Election Commission.

Corporate work

The firm is active in the US capital markets, the Euromarket, and bank lending market, advising investment and commercial banks in their roles as underwriters, initial purchasers, arrangers, agents, and dealer managers. It was Cahill that represented the financing sources in many of Wall Street's historic buyouts, beginning with the leveraged buyout of RJR Nabisco in 1989, up through the mega-buyouts of TXU, Hospital Corporation of America, Kinder Morgan, Harrah’s, Alltel, First Data and Clear Channel in the 2006 and 2007 LBO boom, where the largest buyout records were set.

Offices
New York (Financial District)
London
Washington, DC

Notable attorneys
Floyd Abrams
Michael F. Armstrong
William A. Jacobson
Ellen L. Weintraub
Loretta Lynch (former United States Attorney General)

See also
Floyd Abrams
List of prominent cases argued by Floyd Abrams
Citizens United v. Federal Election Commission
Thomson Financial League Tables

References

External links
Cahill Gordon & Reindel llp Web Site

Law firms based in New York City
Law firms established in 1919
1919 establishments in New York (state)